Frank Wallace (born Frank Valicenti; July 15, 1922 – November 13, 1979) was an American international soccer player who played as forward. He earned 7 caps and scored 3 goals for the United States men's national soccer team, and played in the U.S. team's historic 1–0 victory over England in the 1950 FIFA World Cup. He is a member of the National Soccer Hall of Fame.

Wallace was born in St. Louis, Missouri as Frank Valicenti, but his family changed their name when he was a youth. During World War II, he was captured by the Germans and spent sixteen months in a prisoner of war camp. After returning to St. Louis, he played with Raftery during the 1945–1946 season. He was the third leading scorer in the St. Louis Major League during the 1947–1948 season while playing with Steamfitters.  He later spent ten seasons with St. Louis Simpkins-Ford.

He was inducted into the National Soccer Hall of Fame in 1976 and the St. Louis Soccer Hall of Fame in 1975.

He died November 13, 1979, in St. Louis. He is buried at Resurrection Cemetery, Affton, Missouri.

References

External links
 National Soccer Hall of Fame profile

1922 births
1979 deaths
American soccer players
United States men's international soccer players
National Soccer Hall of Fame members
1950 FIFA World Cup players
St. Louis Simpkins-Ford players
Soccer players from St. Louis
United States Army personnel of World War II
American prisoners of war in World War II
World War II prisoners of war held by Germany
Association football forwards